Prorophora kazachstaniella is a species of snout moth. It is found in Kazakhstan.

References

Phycitinae
Moths described in 2004